Bhojpur is one of the two urban municipalities of Bhojpur District of Province No. 1 of Nepal.

Bhojpiur is the traditional home of the Kirat Rai people and has a long history since the settlement of the Kirat Rai people. Bhojpur bazaar is famous for its metalwork, particularly khukuri knives and Karuwa (metal vessels). It is home to many businesses as well as skilled craftsmen. Other major towns in the district include Dingla to the north, Ghoretar to the south, and Taksar near the airstrip, from where flights connect to Biratnagar and Kathmandu.

The design and construction of the 240 km Koshi Highway in east Nepal between Dharan on the Terai Plain and Num in the Middle Himalaya commenced in the early 1970s and was completed in 2012 when the first vehicles were able to drive to Num.  Construction of this highway links Bhjopur to other major cities and towns like Hile, Dhankuta and Dharan.

Historically it is a part of Majh Kirat (middle Kirat/ Khambuwan), and used to be called "east number 4". Middle Kirat consists mainly of Bhojpur and Khotang districts, the traditional home of kirat Rai people, an indigenous ethnic group of Nepal. In addition to Rais, other ethnic groups include castes like Chhetris, Bahuns, and Dalits.

Background

Bhojpur was a VDC in Bhojpur District before 2014. According to the 2011 Nepal census it had total population of 7,446 with 2,070 households.

On 18 May 2014 Government of Nepal declared 72 new municipality within the hole country. Same time Bhojpur Municipality declared, incorporating Bhojpur, Bhaisipankha, Bokhim and Taksar VDCs diving in 11 ward units.

In March 2017, the Government of Nepal restructured all the local level bodies of Nepal into 753 new local level structures.
The previous Aamtep, Helauchha, Siddheshwar and Gupteshwar VDCs merged again in Bhojpur Municipality and rearranged the 11 wards into 12 wards.

The admin headquarter of the municipality is located at Bhojpur Bazar (ward no. 7).

Constituency
Bhojpur Municipality is divide into two Provincial constituencies as below:

People
Rai people
Newar people

Religion
Hindu
Buddhism
Kirant Mundhum
Christian

College & Universities
Bhojpur Multiple Campus
Nucleus Academy
Bidhyodaya Higher Secondary School
PanchaKanya Secondary School
Yasodhara Higher Secondary School
Sidheswor Higher Secondary School
Teachers Training Center
Shree Janodaya Secondary School
Shree Tyamke Primary School
Shree Jaunagi Adharbhut School

Tourism Spots
Suntale Danda
Bhojpur Airport
Bokhim
Bhaisipankha
Dipsha Village
Tyamke Dada
Maiyung Dada
Shilichung
Hatuwagadhi
Siktel And Pikhuwa KHola
Taksar Temple
Siddhakali Temple
Bhojpur Bazar

Transportation

Airways
Bhojpur Airport

Public Bus
Bhojpur Bus Park

Notable people
Ram Prasad Rai
Dayahang Rai
Bidhya Devi Bhandari
Babu Bhogati
Sher Dhan Rai
Hom Nath Upadhyaya

References

Populated places in Bhojpur District, Nepal
Nepal municipalities established in 2014
Municipalities in Koshi Province
Municipalities in Bhojpur District
Bhojpur Municipality